Rostam Giv or lord Rostam Giv (  alternative spellings: Rustam Guiv) (1888, in Yazd – October 7, 1980 in Whittier),  was the founder of Giv charity foundation, the 3rd representative of Iranian Zoroastrians in Iranian parliament, and a senator of the Iranian Senate.

Life 
Giv was born in 1888 in Yazd. His mother's name was Kharman and his father was named Shahpour.

Giv completed his elementary education at Kay Khosravi school and learned English language in Yazd.
In 1939, Giv was elected as the Zoroastrian's Representative in Iranian National Assembly after the death of Keikhosrow Shahrokh.
He founded "Giv's Charity Foundation" in 1958 for supporting people in need. He was also selected as the senator of the Iranian senate in 1963, due to his charity work for the Iranian people.

Rostam Bagh 
Rostam Bagh, is a large apartment complex which is located in the Tehran Pars suburb of Tehran. Rostam Bagh was built by Arbab Rostam Guiv in 1957 for Zoroastrian people and their families who were living in need. The complex has an area of about 25,000 square meters, including residential buildings, a meeting hall, two schools, a sports ground, library and a Zoroastrian fire temple.

Ab Anbar 
Construction of a 4000-cubic meter capacity ab anbar (a type of water reservoir) in Yazd to provide clean and safe water for people is another one of Giv's charity works.

Building Schools 
Arbab Rustam Guiv has built several schools in Iran, including Giv's Elementary School, Ostad Khdobabakhsh Elementary School, and Ostad Pourdavoud Elementary School, constructed for boys and girls in Tehran. He has also donated 15,000 square meters of land to the Ministry of Education in Damavand County, Tehran.

Endowments outside Iran 
A few months before the Iranian Revolution, Rostam and his wife emigrated to the United States where he established his charity foundations. They donated 4 million dollars towards the building of Zoroastrian charities all over the world, including in New York City, Chicago, Toronto, Vancouver, and Sydney, all outside of Iran.

Gallery

See also 
 Keikhosrow Shahrokh

References 

 Zoroastrian Educational Institute: Arbab Rustam Guiv

External links 
 Darbe Mehr Zoroastrian Temple In NY
 The making of Chicago's Darbe Mehr 
 List of fire temples
 Arbab Rustam Giv Darbe Mehr Rental Ploicy

Iranian Zoroastrians
1888 births
1980 deaths
Members of the Senate of Iran
Iranian philanthropists
20th-century philanthropists
20th-century Iranian politicians
People of Qajar Iran
People of Pahlavi Iran
Exiles of the Iranian Revolution in the United States